Fakhra Younus (1979 – 17 March 2012) was a Pakistani woman who was the victim of an acid attack, which severely injured her face. She underwent 39 surgeries during a 10-year period. She died by suicide at age 33.

Biography

Younus was a dancer in a red-light district in Pakistan,  when she met her future husband, Bilal Khar, the son of Ghulam Mustafa Khar, who himself is a former Governor and Chief Minister of Pakistan's largest province, Punjab. They were married for three years, with Younus eventually leaving him after she claimed he physically and verbally abused her. She further claimed that he later visited her in May 2000 and poured acid on her, in the presence of her 5-year-old son from a different man.

Khar claimed that the attacker was someone else with his name. He was acquitted of all charges in the incident. Younus was sent to Rome, Italy, for treatment by Tehmina Durrani, Khar's stepmother. Initially she was denied a visa, but under public pressure, she was allowed to leave for Italy. Durrani engaged the Italian cosmetic firm Saint Angelic and Italian government to treat her. Smile Again, an Italian NGO head by Clarice Felli entered Pakistan to assist in the care of mutilated women.

Younus committed suicide by jumping from the sixth floor of a building in  Rome, Italy. Her body was brought back to Pakistan by Durrani, and was wrapped in an Italian and Pakistani flag. The funeral prayer of Younus was held at Edhi home in Kharadar. She is buried at Karachi, Pakistan, in the Defence area.

Legacy

Her attack, trial, and suicide received international attention, and highlighted the plight of acid attacks victims in Pakistan. There were 1,375 acid attacks in the country between 2007 and 2016; or some 153 per year; however only 56% are actually female victims or 85 per year. She was featured in the critically acclaimed documentary film, Saving Face (2012), having been awarded the nation's first Oscar less than a month prior to her suicide. As a result of the awareness she helped raise, acid attacks have continuously fallen.

"In 2016 and 2017, there were a total of 71 victims of acid attacks, whereas between 2018 and 2019, there were 62 cases related to acid throwing". Additionally protections have been brought in for women including the very latest Acid and Burn Crime Bill (2017), which "offers free medical treatment and rehabilitation for acid burn victims, who often face lifelong physical and psychological disabilities". The film Younus participated in directly helped in such legislation being brought forward and passed by the parliament.

References

External links
 https://web.archive.org/web/20120326205334/http://images.thenews.com.pk/24-03-2012/ethenews/e-99279.htm

1979 births
2012 suicides
Pakistani victims of crime
Acid attack victims
Suicides by jumping in Italy
Pakistani female dancers
Khar family
Violence against women in Pakistan
Pakistani sex workers